DODDS European Championships are a series of sports competitions taking place in Europe and are organized by the DODDS (Department of Defense Dependents Schools) system. The term "Europeans" is a nickname that collectively refers to the three seasonal championships (autumn, winter and spring respectively) that take place every school year. Both DODDS and other international schools around Europe are invited to compete.

History
DODDS opened its first school on October 14, 1946. It is designed for military children who live overseas on military bases. There are 81 schools in the DODDS system in 9 different countries overseas. The majority of the schools are in Europe. Europeans bring together hundreds of students from these schools all over Europe. Typically, they meet at a main base in Germany such as: Ramstein, Wiesbaden, Baumholder, or Kaiserslautern.

The women’s volleyball teams in Italy are new to Europeans. Before it became part of Europeans it had its own league formerly known as the ISL championships (Italy School Leagues). As of 2005 it was decided that the women’s volleyball teams would also compete against the teams in Germany also. Men’s volleyball is still in its own ISL league due to the lack of men volleyball teams in Germany. Italy is one of the only countries that DODDS schooling has men volleyball.

Sports

Fall Season
 Men’s and Women’s Volleyball
 Football
 Cross Country
 Tennis
 Cheerleading
Men's and Women's Golf

Winter Season
 Men’s and Women’s Basketball
 Cheerleading
 Wrestling

Spring Season
 Men’s and Women’s Track and Field
 Men’s and Women’s Soccer
 Women’s Softball
 Men’s Baseball

Swimming is the only sport that is practiced and competed all year round. It has not yet been officially deemed as part of the DODDS European Competition.

Divisions
Division 1:
Lakenheath High School
Ramstein High School
Kaiserslautern High School
Wiesbaden High School
Stuttgart High School (Germany)
Vilseck High School
Vicenza American High School
Naples American High School
SHAPE High School

Division 2:
American Overseas School of Rome [AOSR]
International School of Brussels
AFNORTH International School
Bitburg Middle-High School
Baumholder Middle-High School
Aviano American High School
Rota (David Glasgow Farragut High School)
Black Forest Academy
Bahrain School
Marymount International School of Rome
International School of Florence

Division 3
Alconbury High School
Sigonella Middle-High School
Brussels American School
Incirlik American High School
Ansbach Middle High School
Hohenfels Middle-High School

References

Department of Defense Education Activity
Sports competitions in Germany
United States Department of Defense agencies